William McGregor Hemingway (12 November 1873, in Macclesfield, Cheshire, England – 11 February 1967, in Paignton, Devon, England) was an English first-class cricketer who played for Gloucestershire and Cambridge University from 1893 to 1900.

Cricket career
In June 1888, Hemingway made his first appearance for Uppingham School before going up to King's College, Cambridge. He made his first-class debut for Gloucestershire in a County Championship match against Nottinghamshire in June, 1893. His highest score of 104 was scored in a match against Cambridge University in May 1895.

References

1873 births
1967 deaths
People educated at Uppingham School
Alumni of King's College, Cambridge
Sportspeople from Macclesfield
English cricketers of 1890 to 1918
Gloucestershire cricketers
English cricketers
Cambridge University cricketers
P. F. Warner's XI cricketers